Boronia tetrandra, commonly known as yellow boronia, is a plant in the citrus family, Rutaceae and is endemic to Western Australia. It is a spreading or erect shrub with hairy stems, pinnate leaves and greenish cream to yellow or reddish brown, cup-shaped, four-petalled flowers.

Description
The leaves are pinnate with between five and thirteen or more well-spaced leaflets. The flowers are greenish cream to yellow or reddish brown, cup-shaped and arranged singly in leaf axils on a short pedicel. The four sepals are broad, hairy and often coloured. The eight stamens alternate in length with those nearest the sepals thick with large anthers and those near the petals curving towards the style and with minute anthers. The stigma has four lobes. Flowering occurs from May to October.

Taxonomy and naming
Boronia tetrandra was first formally described in 1805 by Jacques Labillardière and the description was published in Novae Hollandiae Plantarum Specimen. The specific epithet (tetrandra) is derived from the Ancient Greek words tetra meaning "four" and aner meaning "male".

Distribution and habitat
Yellow boronia grows on granite outcrops, coastal sand dunes and limestone cliffs in the Esperance Plains and Jarrah Forest biogeographic regions.

Conservation
This boronia is classified as "not threatened" by the Western Australian Government Department of Parks and Wildlife.

References

tetrandra
Flora of Western Australia
Plants described in 1805
Taxa named by Jacques Labillardière